The Special Representative for International Trade and Investment was a member of the British royal family who represented the Sovereign for UK Trade & Investment which reports jointly to the Foreign Office and the Department for Business, Innovation and Skills – his role involved representing the United Kingdom at numerous trade fairs and conferences the world over, such as the Davos World Economic Forum. There was no salary associated with the position.

Representatives
The Duke of Kent had been Vice-Chairman of the British Overseas Trade Board, and later Vice-President of British Trade International and then International Trade and Investment from 1976.
The Duke of York took over from the Duke of Kent in this role in 2001 and served until 2011.

See also
Prime Ministerial Trade Envoy

References

Sources
The Duke of York - Official Website
International Trade and Investment Analysis Portal

Foreign relations of the United Kingdom
Trade in the United Kingdom
Investment in the United Kingdom
British royal family